The 2014 Anzac Test was a rugby league test match played between Australia and New Zealand at Allianz Stadium in Sydney on 2 May 2014. It was the 15th Anzac Test played between the two nations since the first was played under the Super League banner in 1997. It was also the first Test match played in Sydney since the 2010 Four Nations tournament. A Women's All Stars Match which is the Women's rugby league version of the game was played as the main curtain raiser for the Test, which was won 24-0 by the Women's All Stars.

Pre-game
In the lead up to the test, Australia named an expected team, though Jarryd Hayne, a revelation in the unfamiliar position of centre during the 2013 World Cup, was unavailable through injury and was replaced by Canterbury's Josh Morris who was playing along his twin brother, St George Illawarra winger Brett. The twins were playing their fourth test alongside each other, and their first in Australia. Melbourne's incumbent Kangaroo halfback Cooper Cronk won a well publicised battle with Manly's Daly Cherry-Evans for the halfback role, though Cherry-Evans was chosen as a reserve being able to cover the halves, hooker or lock. Melbourne hooker Cameron Smith was playing in his 38th test for Australia and his 14th as captain. Coach Tim Sheens named experienced North Queensland Cowboys back Brent Tate as the squads 18th man. Brisbane Broncos utility player and fresh reserve Matt Gillett was the only player on debut for the Kangaroos, replacing injured Broncos team mate Sam Thaiday.

New Zealand however were in trouble with a number of players missing from the 2013 World Cup Final loss to Australia in November. Not selected were the likes of Kevin Locke (languishing in the New Zealand Warriors NSW Cup side thanks to the presence of England fullback Sam Tomkins at the club), Manu Vatuvei, Kieran Foran, Jared Waerea-Hargreaves, Isaac Luke and Sonny Bill Williams. While Foran and Luke were injured and Williams had made himself unavailable, the biggest shock were the omissions of powerhouse winger Vatuvei and Sydney Roosters premiership winning front rower Waerea-Hargreaves. The Kiwis featured five players on debut as Kearney publicly stated they were looking to the future. Playing their first test match for the Kiwis were Manly's Peta Hiku (fullback), Warriors Ben Henry and Siliva Havili (hooker and reserve), West Tigers' Martin Taupau, and Penrith's Isaac John who was playing for the Panthers NSW Cup affiliate the Windsor Wolves when selected. Although it was his debut for NZ, John had previous international experience having represented the Cook Islands at the 2013 World Cup. Another debutante Kenny Bromwich was named as NZ's 18th man.

Due to the relative inexperience of the New Zealanders, and that the Kangaroos were aiming for their 16th straight test win to equal the record of the teams that won 16 straight from 1979-1983, the Australians were short priced odds to win their 14th Anzac Test since the first was held under the Super League banner in 1997 (though as a SL game, the Australian Rugby League (ARL) did not count it as an official Australian test). Many critics felt the game would be an easy win for Australia and the Kiwis were given little chance of pulling off what would have been an upset win.

National Anthems
 TBA - New Zealand National Anthem
 TBA - Australia National Anthem

Squads

1 Replaced originally selected Sam Thaiday who withdrew due to injury.

Match Summary

See also

References

External links

Anzac Test
Rugby league in Sydney
International rugby league competitions hosted by Australia
Anzac Test
Anzac Test